Benjamin Aubert (born 13 November 1997, in Amiens) is a French professional squash player. As of April 2020, he was ranked number 55 in the world.

References

1997 births
Living people
French male squash players
21st-century French people